Á Móti Sól is an Icelandic pop band formed in the fall of 1995 by Þórir Gunnarsson and Heimir Eyvindarson. Stefán Þórhallsson joined the band in the spring of 1997, Sævar Þór Helgason in the spring of 1998, and Magni Ásgeirsson in the fall 1999.

Records and performances

Most of Á Móti Sól's members come from, and continue to be based out of, the south Iceland region that includes the towns of Hveragerði and Selfoss, about 45 km SE of Reykjavik.  The band has released 8 albums, 6 of them with Magni, with three albums achieving gold in Iceland. 

The band's original lead vocalist was Björgvin Hreiðarsson. Björgvin appears on Á Móti Sól's first two albums, but quit in mid-1999.  The band subsequently recruited Magni Ásgeirsson away from the band SHAPE to replace Björgvin. Magni was just 20 years old at the time and was also working as a baker in Egilsstaðir in east Iceland.  His first record with the band was the Christmas song "Þegar jólin koma" ("When Christmas comes" in English), first released in 1999 and also appearing on the album ÁMS.  

The albums 12 íslensk topplög and Hin 12 topplögin, featured songs written by a variety of Icelandic songwriters. The band released a greatest hits collection, Á Móti Sól Í 10 Ár, in 2006; the album is a look back at their greatest hits of the previous ten years, including re-recordings of songs from the 1995-1999 era, such as "Djöfull er ég flottur" and "Sæt", with vocals from Magni.  

In November 2009, the band released their first studio album of original songs in six years, 8.  Recorded over three years in Denmark and Iceland, the album includes the six singles the band released in 2008 and 2009. One of those singles, "Árin," reached number one on the Iceland radio chart.  Keyboardist Heimir Eyvindarson is the band's primary songwriter but other members, particularly Magni and lead guitarist Sævar Þór Helgason, have also contributed to the songwriting, alone and in collaboration.

Á Móti Sól is part of Iceland's sveitaball (country dance) circuit and performs extensively throughout the country, in clubs as well as at school dances.  In August 2007, the band was a headliner at Þjóðhátíð, one of Iceland's most popular music festivals, in Vestmannaeyjar, and performed before a crowd of nearly 50,000 on the main stage at the annual Menningarnótt (Reykjavik Culture Night) festival. The band has also toured extensively, including performances in Denmark, Germany, Norway, Luxemburg and at the famous Cavern Club in Liverpool, England where The Beatles played in the early 1960s.

Magni Ásgeirsson

Magni has also become known as a solo artist in the U.S, Canada and elsewhere outside of Iceland, as a result of competing on U.S. television show, Rock Star: Supernova, in the summer of 2006.  Magni made the finals of the show, finishing in fourth place.  
The original song he performed on the show, "When the Time Comes", is an English version of the Á Móti Sól song, "Þegar tíminn kemur", off the album Fiðrildi. He also informally released English versions of two other Á Móti Sól songs, "My Pain" ("Hver einasti dagur") and "It's Not About Us" ("Hvar sem ég fer"), on his MySpace.  Magni released a solo album in English internationally in 2007 and is working on his second solo album, while continuing to front Á Móti Sól.

In 2010, Magni's record label Spectra Records released two albums by Á Móti Sól. Those albums were "8" and "í 10 Ár" (The Best Of).

Discography

Albums

Singles

"66,50" (1998)
"Á þig" (1998)
"Ekkert mál" (2000)
"Langt fram á nótt" (2004)
"Mamma gefðu mér grásleppu" - with Buff (2009)

References

External links
 Á Móti Sól (in Icelandic)
 Á Móti Sól's blog (in Icelandic)
 Official musician page on Facebook (mostly in Icelandic)

Icelandic pop music groups